The 2007 gubernatorial election in the Mexican state of Yucatán was held  on May 20, 2007, as part of the larger Yucatán state election. Ivonne Ortega Pacheco of the Institutional Revolutionary Party (PRI) was elected Governor of Yucatán for a six-year term.

Election results

References

2007 elections in Mexico
Gubernatorial elections in Mexico
Gubernatorial
Politics of Yucatán
May 2007 events in Mexico